Erythroparvovirus is a genus of viruses in subfamily Parvovirinae of the virus family Parvoviridae. Primates serve as natural hosts. There are seven species in this genus. Diseases associated with this genus include fifth disease and skin lesions.

Taxonomy
The following seven species are assigned to the genus:
Pinniped erythroparvovirus 1
Primate erythroparvovirus 1
Primate erythroparvovirus 2
Primate erythroparvovirus 3
Primate erythroparvovirus 4
Rodent erythroparvovirus 1
Ungulate erythroparvovirus 1

Structure
Viruses in Erythroparvovirus are non-enveloped, with icosahedral and round geometries, and T=1 symmetry. The diameter is around 18-26 nm. Genomes are linear, around 6kb in length.

Life cycle
Viral replication is nuclear. Entry into the host cell is achieved by attachment to host receptors, which mediates clathrin-mediated endocytosis. Replication follows the rolling-hairpin model. Dna templated transcription, with some alternative splicing mechanism is the method of transcription. The virus exits the host cell by nuclear pore export.
Primates serve as the natural host. Transmission routes are oral and respiratory.

References

External links
 Viralzone: Erythroparvovirus
 ICTV

Parvovirinae
Virus genera